Andress Small Floyd (June 7, 1873 - January 10, 1933), was a philanthropist, who founded the Self-Master Colony.

Biography
He was born on June 7, 1873, in Saco, Maine, to Ephriam Hicks Floyd and Olive Small. In 1899 he married Alice D. Hart. He died on January 10, 1933, in Union, New Jersey.

References

External links
 

1873 births
1933 deaths
American philanthropists